Presidential elections were held in Liberia in May 1879. The result was a victory for incumbent President Anthony W. Gardiner of the True Whig Party.

References

Liberia
1879 in Liberia
Elections in Liberia
One-party elections
May 1879 events
Election and referendum articles with incomplete results